Abortion in Tennessee is illegal in all cases.

The ban took effect on August 25, 2022, thirty days after the Tennessee Attorney General notified the Tennessee Code Commission that Roe v. Wade was overturned on June 24, 2022. It is the only state with no direct exception in case of risk to the mother's life; rather, there is an affirmative defense included in the ban, meaning that someone who performs an abortion can be charged with a felony, but they have an opportunity to prove that the procedure was necessary — either to prevent the patient from dying or to prevent serious risk of what the law calls “substantial and irreversible impairment of a major bodily function.” The number of abortion clinics in Tennessee decreased over the years, with 128 in 1982, 33 in 1992, and 7 in 2014. There were 12,373 legal abortions in 2014, and 11,411 in 2015.

History

Legislative history 
The state was one of 10 states in 2007 to have a customary informed consent provision for abortions. In 2013, state Targeted Regulation of Abortion Providers (TRAP) had provisions related to admitting privileges and licensing. They required clinics have hospital privileges and transfer agreement with a hospital.

In 2015 Tennessee established a required 48 hour waiting period before obtaining an abortion.

The state legislature was one of eight states nationwide that tried, and failed, to pass a bill to ban early abortion in 2017. They tried again in 2018, where they were one of ten states that tried and failed to pass a fetal heartbeat bill. Two fetal heartbeat bills were filed in the Tennessee General Assembly in 2019. On January 23, 2019, Rep. James "Micah" Van Huss filed HB 77 in the Tennessee House of Representatives. On February 7, 2019, Sen. Mark Pody filed SB 1236 in the Tennessee Senate. On February 20, 2019, HB 77 was passed out of a Public Health subcommittee and sent to the full committee. On February 26, 2019, the House Public Health Committee voted 15–4 to send HB 77 to the House floor for a full vote. On February 7, 2019, HB 77 was passed out of the Tennessee House by a vote of 66–21. As of May 14, 2019, the state prohibited abortions after the fetus was viable, generally at some point between weeks 24 and 28. This period uses a standard defined by the US Supreme Court in 1973 with the Roe v. Wade ruling and was not a result of state-based legislation. In 2020 Tennessee banned abortions because of a prenatal diagnosis of Down syndrome or because of the gender or race of the fetus.

Due to the trigger law prohibiting abortion from the point of fertilization which was adopted on April 22, 2019, abortion became illegal from the point of conception in Tennessee on July 25, 2022, 30 days after the overturning of Roe v. Wade.

Judicial history 
The US Supreme Court's decision in 1973's Roe v. Wade ruling meant the state could no longer regulate abortion in the first trimester. (However, the Supreme Court overturned Roe v. Wade in Dobbs v. Jackson Women's Health Organization,  later in 2022.)

Tennessee's heartbeat bill and the Texas-style abortion ban have been in court due to pro-abortion rights organizations suing the state of Tennessee.

Clinic history 
Between 1982 and 1992, the number of abortion clinics in the state declined by 47, going from 128 in 1982 to 33 in 1992. In 2014, there were seven abortion clinics in the state. In 2014, 96% of the counties in the state did not have an abortion clinic. That year, 63% of women in the state aged 15–44 lived in a county without an abortion clinic. In 2017, there were four Planned Parenthood clinics, all of which offered abortion services, in a state with a population of 1,519,130 women aged 15–49.

Abortion rights views and activities

Protests 
In 2020, hundreds of people attended the March for Life in Knoxville supporting abortion bans and restrictions.

Women from the state participated in marches supporting abortion rights as part of a #StoptheBans movement in May 2019.

In Memphis and Nashville, groups of people gathered to protest the abortion ban that would take place after the leaked draft opinion overturning Roe v. Wade. Many women shared their abortion stories at the protest.

Municipal actions 
On July 13, 2022, the Memphis City council passed the Reproductive Autonomy is Necessary (RAIN) Act in an effort to lessen the extent to which statewide policy will affect childbearing women in Memphis.

Polling 
In a 2014 poll by the Pew Research Center, 55% of adults in Tennessee said that abortion should be illegal in all or most cases and 40% said it should be legal.

Statistics 
In the period between 1972 and 1974, there were zero recorded illegal abortion death in the state. In 1990, 554,000 women in the state faced the risk of an unintended pregnancy. In 2010, the state had no publicly funded abortions. In 2013, among white women aged 15–19, there were 690 abortions, 650 abortions for black women aged 15–19, 50 abortions for Hispanic women aged 15–19, and 20 abortions for women of all other races. In 2017, the state had an infant mortality rate of 7.4 deaths per 1,000 live births.

According to Pew Research Center, in Tennessee, adults aged 30–49 are the age demographic that has the highest percentage of people thinking abortion should be legal in most cases (35%). According to the Lozier Institute, in 2019, 55% of Tennessee's abortions were at 8 weeks gestation or earlier, 23% were performed at between 9 and 10 weeks, 6% at 13 to 14 weeks, and 2% between 17 and 20 weeks. There were 26 cases of failed abortions with no complications, 17 with delayed or excessive hemorrhage, 15 with delayed or excessive hemorrhage after a failed abortion, and 17 cases that had unspecified complications.

Criminal prosecutions of abortion 
A 31-year-old Tennessean was charged with attempted first-degree murder in December 2015. The charge was based on an attempt to give herself an illegal abortion using a coat hanger.

Notes

References 

Tennessee
Healthcare in Tennessee
Women in Tennessee